The occupation of Western Armenia by the Russian Empire during World War I began in 1915 and was formally ended by the Treaty of Brest-Litovsk. It was sometimes referred to as the Republic of Van by Armenians. Aram Manukian of Armenian Revolutionary Federation was the de facto head until July 1915. It was briefly referred to as "Free Vaspurakan". After a setback beginning in August 1915, it was re-established in June 1916. The region was allocated to Russia by the Allies in April 1916 under the Sazonov–Paléologue Agreement.

From December 1917, it was under Transcaucasian Commissariat, with Hakob Zavriev as the Commissar, and during the early stages of the establishment of First Republic of Armenia, it was included with other Armenian National Councils in a briefly unified Armenia.

This provisional government relied on Armenian volunteer units, forming an administrative structure after the siege of Van around April 1915.  Dominant representation was from the Armenian Revolutionary Federation. Aram Manukian,  or "Aram of Van," was the administration's most famous governor.

Population distribution
During the siege of Van, there were between 67,792 (according to the 1914 Ottoman population estimates) and 185,000 Armenians (according to the Armenian Patriarch's 1912 estimate) in the Van Vilayet. In the city of Van itself there were around 30,000 Armenians, but more Armenians from surrounding villages joined them during the Ottoman offensive.

History

Formation, 1915 
The conflict began on April 20, 1915, with Aram Manukian as the leader of the resistance, and it lasted for two months.  In May, the Armenian battalions and Russian regulars entered the city and drove the Ottoman army out of Van.

Departure from Van 
July was the second month of self-government under the leadership of Manoukian. Then, the conflict turned against the Armenians.  The Ottoman Army, under Pasha Kerim, launched a counterattack in the Lake Van area and defeated the Russians at the Battle of Malazgirt.

The Russians retreated eastward. There were as many as 250,000 Armenians crowded into the city of Van. These people were the escapees from the deportations established by the Tehcir Law; included were also many who broke away from the deportation columns, as they passed the vicinity on their way to Mosul. Armenians from this region retreated to the Russian frontier.

During the counterattack, Manoukian and Sampson Aroutiounian, president of the Armenian National Council of Tbilisi, helped refugees from the region to reach Echmiadzin. As a result of famine and fatigue, many refugees suffered from diseases, especially dysentery. On 29 December 1915, the Dragoman of the Vice-Consulate at Van, according to the Armenian Bishop of Erevan and other sources, was able to procure the Caucasus refugees from the region.

Return to Van 
During the winter of 1915, the Ottoman forces retreated once again, which enabled Aram Manukian to return to Van and re-establish his post. The governor declared strict measures to prevent pillage and destruction of property in December 1915. Some threshing machines and flour mills resumed work in the district so that bakeries could reopen, and the restoration of buildings commenced in some streets.

Expansion, 1916 
At the turn of 1916, Armenian refugees returned to their homes, but the Russian government raised barriers in prevention.  During 1916–17 about 8,000 to 10,000 Armenians were permitted to inhabit Van.

One report said: 
"Men are going in large numbers; caravans of those returning to the fatherland enter via Iğdır. Most of the refugees in the Erevan province returned to Van."

The Near East relief brought relief to the victims of the war and organized in 1916 a Children's Home in Van. Children's Home helped children to learn reading and writing and supplied them nice clothes. Near East relief worked in Syria and "several hundred thousand" during the Caucasus Campaign.

Russian plans 
In April 1915, Nikolai Yudenich reported the following to Count Illarion Ivanovich Vorontsov-Dashkov:

The agricultural possibilities located off the Black Sea coastal districts and the upper reaches of the Euphrates were considered suitable for Russian colonists.  Following the April 1916 Sazonov–Paléologue Agreement, the Rules for the Temporary Administration of Turkish Areas occupied by the Right of War was signed on June 18, 1916, instructing a governorship under the established system of Aram Manukian.

The settlement, 1917 
Approximately 150,000 Armenians relocated to Erzurum Vilayet, Bitlis Vilayet, Mush and Van Vilayet in 1917.

Special Transcaucasus Committee 
The Viceroyalty of the Caucasus was abolished by the Russian Provisional Government on March 18, 1917, and all authority, except in the zone of the active army, was entrusted to the civil administrative body called the Special Transcaucasian Committee, or Ozakom. Hakob Zavriev was instrumental in having Ozakom issue a decree about the administration of the occupied territories. This region was officially identified as "the land of Western Armenia" and transferred to a civilian rule under Zavriev, who oversaw districts Trebizon, Erzurum, Bitlis, and Van.

National frontline 
The Russian army in the Caucasus was organized along national and ethnic lines, such as the Armenian volunteer units and Russian Caucasus Army on the eve of 1917.  However, the Russian Caucasus Army disintegrated, leaving Armenian soldiers to become the only defenders against the Ottoman Army.

The front line had three main divisions, led respectively by Movses Silikyan, Andranik Ozanian and Mikhail Areshian. Armenian partisan guerrilla detachments accompanied these main units.

Retreat, 1918
The chairman of the Van Relief Committee (Near East Relief) was Kostin Hambartsumian, who, taking into consideration the general political situation, conveyed the one thousand five hundred orphans of Children's Home of Van to Gyumri in 1917.

Treaty of Brest-Litovsk, March 1918 

A new border was drawn by the Treaty of Brest-Litovsk, signed between Russian SFSR and the Ottoman Empire on March 3, 1918.  The treaty assigned the Van Vilayet alongside the Kars Vilayet, Ardahan, and Batum regions to the Ottoman Empire. The treaty also stipulated that Transcaucasia was to be declared independent.

The Resistance, March 1918 
The Armenian Congress of Eastern Armenians (ACEA) representatives on the Duma joined their colleagues in declaring independence of the Transcaucasus from Russia.

On April 5, head of the Transcaucasian delegation Akakii Chkhenli accepted the Treaty as a basis for negotiation and wired the governing bodies, urging them to accept this position. The mood prevailing in Tiflis was very different; the treaty did not create a united block. Armenia acknowledged the existence of a state of war with the Ottoman Empire. This short-lived Transcaucasian Federation broke up. Once they were free from Russian control, the ACEA declared the inauguration of the  Democratic Republic of Armenia. ACEA did not recognize the Treaty of Brest-Litovsk, and the Ottoman Empire was opposed to the Democratic Republic of Armenia. The ACEA devised policies to direct the war effort as well as the relief and repatriation of refugees, passing a law organizing the defense of the Caucasus against the Ottoman Empire, using supplies and munitions left by the Russian army. The Armenian Congress also selected a 15-member permanent executive committee, known as the Armenian National Council.  The chairman of this committee was Avetis Aharonyan, who  declared that the Administration of Western Armenia was part of the Democratic Republic of Armenia.

The Ottoman Empire's War Minister, Enver Pasha, sent the Third Army to Armenia. Under heavy pressure from the combined forces of the Ottoman army and the Kurdish irregulars, the Armenian Republic was forced to withdraw from Erzincan to Erzurum. The Battle of Sardarapat, May 22–26, 1918, proved that General Movses Silikyan could force an Ottoman retreat. Further southeast, in Van, the Armenians resisted the Ottoman army until April 1918, while in Van the Armenians were forced to evacuate and withdraw to Persia. Richard G. Hovannisian explains the conditions of their resistance during March 1918: 

The Azerbaijani Tatars sided with the Ottoman Empire and seized the lines of communication, cutting off the Armenian National Councils in Baku and Erevan from the National Council in Tbilisi.  The British sent a small military force under the command of Gen. Lionel Charles Dunsterville into Baku, arriving on August 4, 1918.

On October 30, 1918, the Ottoman Empire signed the Armistice of Mudros, and military activity in the region ceased. Enver Pasha's movement disintegrated with the armistice.

Recognition Efforts

The Treaty of Brest-Litovsk, between the Ottoman Empire and Russian SFSR, included the establishment of Armenia in Russian Armenia. The Administration for Western Armenia had a setback with the Treaty of Batum, forcing the Armenian borders to be pushed deeper into Russian Armenia.

During the Conference of London, David Lloyd George encouraged American President Woodrow Wilson to accept a mandate for Anatolia, particularly with the support of the Armenian diaspora, for the provinces claimed by the Administration of Western Armenia during its largest occupation in 1916. "Wilsonian Armenia" became part of the Treaty of Sèvres.

The realities on the ground, however, were slightly different. The idea was blocked by both the Treaty of Alexandropol and the Treaty of Kars. The Treaty of Sèvres was superseded by the Treaty of Lausanne, and the fight for the "Administration for Western Armenia" was dropped off the table.

As a continuation of the initial goal, the creation of a "free, independent, and united" Armenia including all the territories designated as Wilsonian Armenia by the Treaty of Sèvres — as well as the regions of Artsakh and Javakhk— was the main goal of the Armenian Revolutionary Federation.

Administration

Governors 
Jun 1916 – Dec 1917        Aram Manukian (interim)
Dec 1917 – Mar 1918        Tovmas Nazarbekian
Mar 1918 – Apr 1918        Andranik Ozanian

Civil affairs 
May 1917 – Dec 1917        Hakob Zavriev

Civil Commissioner 
Dec 1917 –  Apr 7, 1918     Drastamat Kanayan

Timeline 
 April 19, 1915: Fire in the powder stores of the Van armoury.
 April 20, 1915: Armenians in the city of Van, the countryside, and small towns begin a local uprising.
 April 24, 1915: Ottoman governor asks permission to move the Muslim civilian population to the west.
 May 2, 1915: Ottoman Army moves close to Van, but withdraws because of the presence of the Russian Army.
 May 3, 1915: Russian Army enters Van.
 August 16, 1915: Ottoman Army besieges Van; Battle of Van.
 September 1915: Ottoman Army is forced out by Russians.
 April 1916: Sazonov–Paléologue Agreement
 August 1916: Ottoman Army moves to the west of the region (Mush and Bitlis), but is forced out within a month.
 February 1917: Russian units disintegrate. Armenian volunteer units keep formation.
 September 1917: The Armenian Congress of Eastern Armenia merges Armenian volunteer units into a single militia under its control.
 February 10, 1918: The Duma of the Transcaucasus convenes.
 February 24, 1918: The Duma of the Transcaucasus declares the region to be an independent, democratic, federative republic.
 March 3, 1918: The Treaty of Brest-Litovsk gives Kars, Ardahan, and Batum regions to the Ottoman Empire.
 March 4, 1918: The Administration for Western Armenia condemns the Treaty of Brest-Litovsk.
 March 9, 1918: The Administration for Western Armenia presents its position to the Ottoman Empire.
 May 22, 1918: Battle of Sardarapat; Armenian militia fight against the Ottoman Empire.
 May 28, 1918: The Armenian Congress of Eastern Armenia declares the formation of the Democratic Republic of Armenia and its independence from the Transcaucasian Democratic Federative Republic.
 August 4, 1918: General Lionel Charles Dunsterville leads a British expeditionary force into Baku and becomes the city's military governor.
 October 30, 1918: The Ottoman Empire signs the Armistice of Mudros, agreeing to leave the Transcaucasus.

References

External links
Bryce Report: A summary of Armenian history to 1915
Self-defense Battle Memorial of Artsiv Vaspurakan in Agarak village, Armenia

States and territories disestablished in 1918
States and territories established in 1915
Subdivisions of the Ottoman Empire
Politics of the Ottoman Empire
Erzurum vilayet
Bitlis vilayet
Trebizond vilayet
Van vilayet
Provisional governments
1910s in Armenia
Western Armenia
Invasions by Russia
Russian Empire in World War I
Military occupation
Ottoman Empire in World War I